"Shine: The Best of Annie Crummer" is a greatest hits album by New Zealand singer, Annie Crummer released in 2002.

Track listing
See What Love Can Do with Herbs
Language
State of Grace
U Soul Me
Asian Paradise with When The Cat's Away
Melting Pot with When The Cat's Away
For Today with Netherworld Dancing Toys
Keeping Up The Love Thing as the Katene Sisters
You Oughta Be in Love
Love Not War
Surrender
Seven Waters
Make Up
Guilty
Once Or Twice
I Hope I Never as part of ENZSO
Let It Shine

Annie Crummer albums
2002 greatest hits albums